The UAE Oaks is a flat horse race in the United Arab Emirates for three-year-old thoroughbred fillies run over 1900 metres on dirt at Meydan Racecourse in Dubai in late February or early March.

It was first contested in 2001 over 1800 metres on dirt at Nad Al Sheba Racecourse before being transferred to Meydan in 2010 where it was run on the synthetic Tapeta Footings surface and the distance extended. In 2015 the synthetic surface at Meydan was replaced by a dirt track.

The UAE Oaks began as an ungraded race before promoted to Listed level in 2006. It was elevated to Group 3 in 2011.

Records
Record time:
1:48.59 - Folk 2007 (1800 metres)
1:58.35 - Down On Da Bayou 2020 (1900 metres)

Most wins by a jockey:
 6 - Frankie Dettori 2001, 2002, 2003, 2005, 2009, 2011

Most wins by a trainer:
 10 - Saeed bin Suroor 2001, 2002, 2003, 2005, 2008, 2009, 2011, 2013, 2014, 2015

Most wins by an owner:
 11 - Godolphin Racing 2001, 2002, 2003, 2005, 2009, 2011, 2012, 2013, 2014, 2015, 2019

Winners

See also
Road to the Kentucky Oaks
 List of United Arab Emirates horse races

References

Racing Post:

Flat horse races for three-year-olds
Triple Crown Prep Races
Horse races in the United Arab Emirates
Nad Al Sheba Racecourse